Duke of Feria is a hereditary title in the Peerage of Spain accompanied by the dignity of Grandee, granted in 1567 by Philip II to Gómez Suárez de Figueroa, 5th Count of Feria.

The name makes reference to the town of Feria in Badajoz.

Dukes of Feria

Gómez Suárez de Figueroa y Córdoba, 1st Duke of Feria
Lorenzo Suárez de Figueroa y Dormer, 2nd Duke of Feria
Gómez Suárez de Figueroa y Mendoza, 3rd Duke of Feria
Lorenzo Gaspar Suárez de Figueroa y Fernández de Córdoba, 4th Duke of Feria
Alonso Fernández de Córdoba y Enríquez de Ribera, 5th Duke of Feria
Luis Ignacio Fernández de Córdoba y Fernández de Córdoba, 6th Duke of Feria
Luis Mauricio Fernández de Córdoba y Fernández de Córdoba, 7th Duke of Feria
Manuel Fernández de Córdoba y de la Cerda, 8th Duke of Feria
Nicolás Fernández de Córdoba y de la Cerda, 9th Duke of Feria
Luis Antonio Fernández de Córdoba y Spínola, 10th Duke of Feria
Pedro de Alcántara Fernández de Córdoba y Moncada, 11th Duke of Feria
Luis María Fernández de Córdoba y Moncada, 12th Duke of Feria
Luis Joaquín Fernández de Córdoba y Benavides, 13th Duke of Feria
Luis Tomás Fernández de Córdoba y Ponce de León, 14th Duke of Feria 
Antonio Fernández de Córdoba y Ponce de León, 15th Duke of Feria
Luis María Fernández de Córdoba y Pérez de Barradas, 16th Duke of Feria
Luis Fernández de Córdoba y Salabert, 17th Duke of Feria
Victoria Eugenia Fernández de Córdoba y Fernández de Henestrosa, 18th Duchess of Feria
Rafael de Medina y Fernández de Córdoba, 19th Duke of Feria
Rafael de Medina y Abascal, 20th Duke of Feria

See also
List of dukes in the peerage of Spain
List of current Grandees of Spain

References

Grandees of Spain
Dukes of Spain
Lists of Spanish nobility
 
Noble titles created in 1567